The women's 1500 metres event at the 2003 Summer Universiade was held in Daegu, South Korea with the final on 26–28 August.

Medalists

Results

Heats

Final

References
Results

Athletics at the 2003 Summer Universiade
2003 in women's athletics
2003